The Wildflower Film Awards is an awards ceremony recognizing the achievements of Korean independent and low-budget films. The awards, presented by the Wildflower Film Awards Korea - a grassroots effort by a group of film critics led by founder and organizer Darcy Paquet (with the participation of Oh Dong-jin), aims to create more publicity in Korea and abroad for filmmakers working outside of the mainstream commercial film industry. Awards are handed out annually to films released in the previous year.

In 2016, Best New Actor and Actress categories were merged and a new Best Supporting Performer section was added.

In 2018, a new category for Best Music and Best Producer were added.

In 2020, the Best New Director (Narrative Films) and Best New Director (Documentaries) categories were merged.

Categories
Grand Prize 
Best Film 
Best Director (Narrative Films)
Best Director (Documentaries)
Best Actor
Best Actress
Best Screenplay
Best Cinematography
Best New Director
Best New Actor
Best New Actress
Special Commendations

Grand Prize

Best Film

Best Director (Narrative Films)

Best Director (Documentaries)

Best Actor

Best Actress

Best Screenplay

Best Cinematography

Best Music

Best Producer

Best New Director (Narrative Films)

Best New Director (Documentaries)

Best New Director (Combined)

Best New Actor

Best New Actress

Best New Actor/Actress

Best Supporting Actor/Actress

Special Commendations

References

External links 

Wildflower Film Awards at Koreanfilm.org

 
South Korean film awards
Awards established in 2014
2014 establishments in South Korea
Annual events in South Korea